Northern Vietnam key economic region is one of the three key economic regions of Vietnam, encompassing the capital Hanoi which stands out as a political, cultural, economic, techno-scientific center driving the socio-economic development to neighboring provinces and municipalities.

Composition
The Northern Key Economic Region covers 7 provinces and municipalities:
 Hanoi
 Haiphong
 Quang Ninh Province 
 Vinh Phuc Province 
 Bac Ninh Province 
 Hung Yen Province  
 Hai Duong Province

References

Economy of Vietnam